Eric Tonks (17 July 1914 – 26 December 1994) was an English writer and historian of British industrial railways. He is regarded as one of the pioneers of the industrial archaeology of railways and quarrying. He was also a noted Jazz discographer.

Industrial railways 
In 1949, Tonks was one of the founders of the Birmingham Locomotive Club and he was the club's president for 25 years. He also set up the club's Industrial Locomotive Section, which later became the Industrial Railway Society. He compiled a well-regarded study of the development of British preserved railways.

Author 
Tonks was a prolific author on the related subjects of industrial history and industrial railways. He began his writing career with a book on the Edge Hill Light Railway, and he was an acknowledged expert in the history of that railway.

He is particularly known for his "magnum opus" 9-volume series of books on the ironstone industry of The Midlands, which is considered the standard work on the subject. Tonks began work on this series with the publication of a single volume in 1959. This was expanded into 9 volumes in the 1980s and 1990s. These books are acknowledged as a "great work...on industrial infrastructure" and the 1959 edition was one of the first books to integrate the study of industrial railway history with the wider historical and social aspects of the industries they served.

Other interests 
Tonks was a founding member of the Motor Registration Circuit, a club based in the Midlands for car license plate spotting enthusiasts. He was considered an expert in this field. He was also a well-known Jazz aficionado, who wrote a regular column for Discography magazine and was considered an expert in the field of Jazz discographies.

Works

Ironstone Quarries 
Originally published as:
 

Full series:

Other books

References 

1914 births
1995 deaths
English non-fiction writers
Rail transport writers
Railway historians
English male non-fiction writers
20th-century English male writers